Heavy Petting is a 2007 American romantic comedy film written and directed by Marcel Sarmiento. The film follows a young man as he falls in love with a girl, but has to battle with her dog for her affections, only to discover that he himself is falling in love with the dog.

Cast
 Malin Åkerman as Daphne
 Brendan Hines as Charlie
 Mike Doyle as James
 Kevin Sussman as Ras
 Juan Hernandez as Juan
 Marcel Sarmiento as Louis
 Sam Coppola as old codger #1
 Allie Woods as old codger #2
 Krysten Ritter as innocent bystander
 Casper the dog as Babydoll

References

External links
 
 

2007 films
2007 independent films
2007 romantic comedy films
American independent films
American romantic comedy films
Films about dogs
Films about pets
Films set in New York City
Films shot in New York City
2000s English-language films
2000s American films